The blue-shouldered robin-chat (Cossypha cyanocampter) is a species of bird in the family Muscicapidae.

It is widespread across the African tropical rainforest.

Its natural habitats are subtropical or tropical moist lowland forests and subtropical or tropical moist montane forests.

References

blue-shouldered robin-chat
Birds of the African tropical rainforest
blue-shouldered robin-chat
blue-shouldered robin-chat
Taxonomy articles created by Polbot